Cochlostyla is a genus of small, air-breathing land snails, terrestrial pulmonate gastropod molluscs in the family Camaenidae, subfamily Helicostylinae.

Species
Species within the genus Cochlostyla include:
 
 Cochlostyla acuminata (G. B. Sowerby I, 1841)
 Cochlostyla aegle (Broderip, 1841)
 Cochlostyla albaiensis (G. B. Sowerby I, 1840)
 Cochlostyla annae O. Semper, 1862
 Cochlostyla annulata (G. B. Sowerby I, 1841)
 Cochlostyla aopta (Clench & Archer, 1933)
 Cochlostyla aplomorpha (Jonas, 1843)
 Cochlostyla balanoides (Jonas, 1843)
 Cochlostyla balteata (G. B. Sowerby I, 1841)
 Cochlostyla belcheri (L. Pfeiffer, 1851)
 Cochlostyla bembicodes (L. Pfeiffer, 1852)
 Cochlostyla bicolorata  (I. Lea, 1840)
 Cochlostyla bicolorata amaliae
 Cochlostyla boettgeriana Möllendorff, 1888
 Cochlostyla bopolonsis
 Cochlostyla brevicula (L. Pfeiffer, 1842)
 Cochlostyla bruguieriana (L. Pfeiffer, 1845)
 Cochlostyla buschi  (L. Pfeiffer, 1846)
 Cochlostyla bustoi Hidalgo, 1887
 Cochlostyla butleri (L. Pfeiffer, 1852)
 Cochlostyla caesar (L. Pfeiffer, 1855)
 Cochlostyla cailliaudi (Deshayes, 1839)
 Cochlostyla calista
 Cochlostyla calypso (Broderip, 1841)
 Cochlostyla camelopardalis (Broderip, 1841)
 Cochlostyla chlorochroa (G. B. Sowerby I, 1841)
 Cochlostyla carinata
 Cochlostyla chrysallidiformis
 Cochlostyla chrysocheila (G. B. Sowerby I, 1841)
 Cochlostyla cincinniformis (G. B. Sowerby I, 1841)
 Cochlostyla cinerascensis (L. Pfeiffer, 1845)
 Cochlostyla cinerosa (L. Pfeiffer, 1855)
 Cochlostyla coccomelos (G. B. Sowerby I, 1841)
 Cochlostyla concinnus (G. B. Sowerby I, 1841)
 Cochlostyla contracta
 Cochlostyla coronadoi (Hidalgo, 1868)
 Cochlostyla cossmanniana Crosse, 1886 (taxon inquirendum)
 Cochlostyla cryptica (Broderip, 1841)
 Cochlostyla cumingi (L. Pfeiffer, 1855)
 Cochlostyla curta (G. B. Sowerby I, 1841)
 Cochlostyla damahoyi (L. Pfeiffer, 1857)
 Cochlostyla daphnis
 Cochlostyla dattaensis O. Semper, 1866
 Cochlostyla decoarata (Férussac, 1821)
 Cochlostyla decora (A. Adams & Reeve, 1850)
 Cochlostyla denticulata (Jay, 1839)
 Cochlostyla depressa C. Semper, 1887
 Cochlostyla diana (Broderip, 1841)
 Cochlostyla difficilis (L. Pfeiffer, 1854)
 Cochlostyla dilatata (L. Pfeiffer, 1846)
 Cochlostyla dimera (Jonas, 1846)
 Cochlostyla dubiosa (L. Pfeiffer, 1845)
 Cochlostyla dumonti (L. Pfeiffer, 1846)
 Cochlostyla eburnea (Reeve, 1848)
 Cochlostyla effusa (L. Pfeiffer, 1855)
 Cochlostyla electrica
 Cochlostyla elerae Möllendorff, 1896
 Cochlostyla evanescens (Broderip, 1841)
 Cochlostyla fenestrata (G. B. Sowerby I, 1841)
 Cochlostyla festiva (Donovan, 1825)
 Cochlostyla fictilis (Broderip, 1841)
 Cochlostyla florida (G. B. Sowerby I, 1841)
 Cochlostyla frater (Férussac, 1821)
 Cochlostyla fulgens (G. B. Sowerby I, 1842)
 Cochlostyla fulgetrum
 Cochlostyla fuliginata Martens, 1873
 Cochlostyla generalis (L. Pfeiffer, 1854)
 Cochlostyla gilberti Quadras & Möllendorff, 1896
 Cochlostyla gilva
 Cochlostyla glaucophthalma (L. Pfeiffer, 1851)
 Cochlostyla globosula Möllendorff, 1894
 Cochlostyla gmeliniana (L. Pfeiffer, 1845)
 Cochlostyla halichlora C. Semper, 1866
 Cochlostyla harfordii (Broderip, 1841)
 Cochlostyla hemisphaerion (L. Pfeiffer, 1850)
 Cochlostyla hidalgoi Möllendorff, 1894
 Cochlostyla hololeuca (L. Pfeiffer, 1855)
 Cochlostyla ignobilis (G. B. Sowerby I, 1841)
 Cochlostyla iloconensis (G. B. Sowerby I, 1841)
 Cochlostyla incompta (G. B. Sowerby I, 1841)
 Cochlostyla intorta (G. B. Sowerby I, 1840)
 Cochlostyla irosinensis  (Hidalgo, 1887)
 Cochlostyla jonasi (L. Pfeiffer, 1846)
 Cochlostyla lacera (L. Pfeiffer, 1854)
 Cochlostyla lalloensis (L. Pfeiffer, 1855)
 Cochlostyla lamellicostis Möllendorff, 1895
 Cochlostyla leai (L. Pfeiffer, 1847)
 Cochlostyla leopardus (L. Pfeiffer, 1845)
 Cochlostyla leucauchen Möllendorff, 1895
 Cochlostyla leucophaea (G. B. Sowerby I, 1841)
 Cochlostyla librosa (L. Pfeiffer, 1857)
 Cochlostyla lignaria
 Cochlostyla lillianae P. Bartsch, 1932
 Cochlostyla limansauensis C. Semper, 1873
 Cochlostyla lividocincta
 Cochlostyla luzonica (L. Pfeiffer, 1855)
 Cochlostyla macrostoma (L. Pfeiffer, 1842)
 Cochlostyla magtanensis C. Semper, 1873
 Cochlostyla marinduquensis
 Cochlostyla martensi Möllendorff, 1898
 Cochlostyla matruelis (G. B. Sowerby I, 1841)
 Cochlostyla melanocheila (L. Pfeiffer, 1842)
 Cochlostyla melanoraphe Quadras & Möllendorff, 1896
 Cochlostyla metaformis (Férussac, 1821)
 Cochlostyla metallorum Möllendorff, 1898
 Cochlostyla microspira (L. Pfeiffer, 1853)
 Cochlostyla mindorensis
 Cochlostyla mirabilis
 Cochlostyla montana C. Semper, 1887
 Cochlostyla montfortiana (L. Pfeiffer, 1847)
 Cochlostyla monticula (G. B. Sowerby I, 1841)
 Cochlostyla mus (Broderip, 1841)
 Cochlostyla nimbosa (Broderip, 1841)
 Cochlostyla nobilis (Reeve, 1848)
 Cochlostyla norrisii (L. Pfeiffer, 1842)
 Cochlostyla obtusa (L. Pfeiffer, 1845)
 Cochlostyla opalina (G. B. Sowerby I, 1841)
 Cochlostyla orbitula (G. B. Sowerby I, 1841)
 Cochlostyla ovoidea (Bruguière, 1789)
 Cochlostyla palavanensis (L. Pfeiffer, 1857)
 Cochlostyla pan (Broderip, 1841)
 Cochlostyla partuloides
 Cochlostyla perpallida P. Bartsch, 1932
 Cochlostyla phaeostyla (L. Pfeiffer, 1856)
 Cochlostyla philippinensis
 Cochlostyla pictor (Broderip, 1841)
 Cochlostyla pithogaster
 Cochlostyla polillensis (L. Pfeiffer, 1861)
 Cochlostyla polychroa (G. B. Sowerby I, 1841)
 Cochlostyla portei (L. Pfeiffer, 1856)
 Cochlostyla porteri
 Cochlostyla pulchella Möllendorff, 1893
 Cochlostyla pulcherrima (G. B. Sowerby I, 1841)
 Cochlostyla pyramidalis (G. B. Sowerby I, 1841)
 Cochlostyla quadrasi
 Cochlostyla quadrifasciata Hidalgo, 1896
 Cochlostyla rehbeini (L. Pfeiffer, 1852)
 Cochlostyla retusa (L. Pfeiffer, 1845)
 Cochlostyla roebeleni Möllendorff, 1894
 Cochlostyla roissyana (Férussac, 1822)
 Cochlostyla rufogaster (Lesson, 1832)
 Cochlostyla samarensis C. Semper, 1873
 Cochlostyla saranganica Möllendorff, 1890
 Cochlostyla sarcinosa (Férussac, 1821)
 Cochlostyla satyrus (Broderip, 1841)
 Cochlostyla semperi Möllendorff, 1893
 Cochlostyla senckendorffiana (L. Pfeiffer, 1847)
 Cochlostyla simplex (Jonas, 1843)
 Cochlostyla smaragdina (Reeve, 1842)
 Cochlostyla solivaga (Reeve, 1848)
 Cochlostyla sphaerica (G. B. Sowerby I, 1841)
 Cochlostyla sphaerion (G. B. Sowerby I, 1841)
 Cochlostyla stabilis (G. B. Sowerby I, 1841)
 Cochlostyla streptostoma Möllendorff, 1893
 Cochlostyla subcarinata (L. Pfeiffer, 1855)
 Cochlostyla succincta (Reeve, 1848)
 Cochlostyla suprabadia C. Semper, 1874
 Cochlostyla tenera (G. B. Sowerby I, 1841)
 Cochlostyla tephrodes (L. Pfeiffer, 1842)
 Cochlostyla ticaonica
 Cochlostyla trisculpta Möllendorff, 1894
 Cochlostyla turbinoides (Broderip, 1841)
 Cochlostyla turbo (L. Pfeiffer, 1845)
 Cochlostyla uber (L. Pfeiffer, 1842)
 Cochlostyla unica (L. Pfeiffer, 1842)
 Cochlostyla valenciennii (Eydoux, 1838)
 Cochlostyla vantricosa
 Cochlostyla velata (Broderip, 1841)
 Cochlostyla versicolor Möllendorff, 1894
 Cochlostyla virginiea (I. Lea, 1841)
 Cochlostyla weberi P. Bartsch, 1919
 Cochlostyla woodiana (I. Lea, 1840)
 Cochlostyla woodiana ingens
 Cochlostyla woodiana reevei
 Cochlostyla woodianus
 Cochlostyla worcesteri P. Bartsch, 1909
 Cochlostyla xanthobasis Pilsbry, 1891
 Cochlostyla zonifera (L. Pfeiffer, 1842)

References

Zipcodezoo
 Pfeiffer, L. (1868). Monographia heliceorum viventium. Sistens descriptiones systematicas et criticas omnium huius familiae generum et specierum hodie cognitarum. Volumen sextum. Lipsiae. (Brockhaus). 1-598.
 Bank, R. A. (2017). Classification of the Recent terrestrial Gastropoda of the World. Last update: July 16th, 2017

External links
 Férussac, A.E.J.P.F. d'Audebard de (1821-1822). Tableaux systématiques des animaux mollusques classés en familles naturelles, dans lesquels on a établi la concordance de tous les systèmes; suivis d'un Prodrome général pour tous les mollusques ou fluviatiles, vivantes ou fossiles, Livraison 9: 1-24 (Quarto edition) [Folio edition: 1-32 (6-IV-1821); livr. 10: 25-48 (Quarto) [Folio: 33-56] (26-V-1821); livr. 11: 49-72 (Quarto) [Folio: 57-76] (13-VII-1821); livr. 12: 73-88 (Quarto) [Folio: 77-92] (21-IX-1821); livr. 13: 89-110 (Quarto) [Folio: 93-114] (10-XI-1821); livr. 14: i-xxiv (Quarto) (16-II-1822); livr. 15: xxv-xlvii[i] (Quarto) (13-IV-1822); livr. 16: 1-27 (Quarto) (13-VII-1822). – Paris / London (Arthus Bertrand / G.B. Sowerby)]
 Broderip, W. J. (1841). Description of shells collected and brought to this country by Hugh Cuming, Esq. Proceedings of the Zoological Society of London. 8 ["1840": 83-87, 94-96, 119-124, 155-159, 180-182. London]
 Hartmann, J.D.W. (1840-1844). Erd- und Süsswasser-Gasteropoden der Schweiz. Mit Zugabe einiger merkwürdigen exotischen Arten, i-xx, 1-36, pl. 1-2 [30-06-1840; 37-116, pl. 13-36 [1841]; 117-156, pl. 37-60 [1842]; 157-204, pl. 61-72 [1843]; 205-227, pl. 73-84 [1844]. St. Gallen]
 Beck, H. (1837). Index molluscorum praesentis aevi musei principis augustissimi Christiani Frederici. 1-124. Hafniae
 Albers, J.C.; Martens E. von. (1860). Die Heliceen nach natürlicher Verwandtschaft systematisch geordnet von Joh. Christ. Albers. Zweite Ausgabe. I-XVIII, 1-359. Leipzig: Engelman
 Pilsbry, H. A. (1891). Manual of conchology, structural and systematic, with illustrations of the species, Second series: Pulmonata. Vol. VII. Helicidae Vol. V. 225 pp. Philadelphia: Conchological Section, Academy of Natural Sciences
 Möllendorff, O. F. von. (1898). Verzeichnis der auf den Philippinen lebenden Landmollusken. Abhandlungen und Berichte des Naturkundemuseums Görlitz. 22: 26-208.

Camaenidae